The Rolling Stones' 1964 2nd British Tour was a concert tour. The tour commenced on February 8 and concluded on March 7, 1964. They played 2 shows at all venues.

Tour band
Mick Jagger - lead vocals, harmonica, percussion
Keith Richards - guitar, backing vocals
Brian Jones - guitar, harmonica, backing vocals
Bill Wyman - bass guitar, backing vocals
Charlie Watts - drums

Tour dates

References
 Carr, Roy.  The Rolling Stones: An Illustrated Record.  Harmony Books, 1976.  

The Rolling Stones concert tours
1964 concert tours
1964 in the United Kingdom
February 1964 events in the United Kingdom
March 1964 events in the United Kingdom
Concert tours of the United Kingdom